Amphisbaena medemi is a species of worm lizard in the family Amphisbaenidae. The species is endemic to Colombia.

Etymology
The specific name, medemi, is in honor of Federico Medem, who was a Colombian herpetologist, of Baltic German descent.

Geographic range
In Colombia, A. medemi is found in the departments of Atlántico, Cesar, and La Guajira.

Habitat

Reproduction
A. medemi is oviparous.

References

Further reading
Gans, Carl; Mathers, Sandra (1977). "Amphisbaena medemi, An Interesting New Species from Colombia (Amphisbaenia, Reptilia), with a Key to the Amphisbaenians of the Americas". Fieldiana Zoology 72 (2): 21-46.
Meza-Joya, Fabio Leonardo (2015). "New records of Amphisbaena medemi Gans & Mathers, 1977 (Squamata: Amphisbaenidae) from the Caribbean region of northern Colombia". Check List the journal of biodiversity data 1 (1): (Article 1526) 1-3.
Vanzolini PE (2002). "An aid to the identification of the South American species of Amphisbaena (Squamata, Amphisbaenidae)". Papéis Avulsos de Zoologia, Museu de Zoologia da Univeridade de São Paulo 42 (15): 351-362.

medemi
Reptiles described in 1977
Taxa named by Carl Gans
Taxa named by Sandra Mathers
Endemic fauna of Colombia
Reptiles of Colombia